The 2021 NCAA Beach Volleyball Championship was held from May 7 through May 9, 2021 in Gulf Shores, Alabama as the final part of the 2021 NCAA Beach Volleyball season. It was the fifth edition of the NCAA Beach Volleyball Championship that began in 2016. The top-seeded UCLA Bruins are back-to-back defending champions, having won in 2018 and 2019. All divisions of the NCAA are eligible to compete in the Beach Volleyball Championship, however all teams through the 2021 Championship have been Division I members. USC won the title.

Participants

Bracket

Bracket source:

All-Tournament Team
At the conclusion of the championship, five pairs (selected from all teams in the field) were honored as members of the All-Tournament Team.

References

2021 in sports in Alabama
2021 in beach volleyball